"Love Is All We Need" is a 1997 song by Mary J. Blige.

Love Is All We Need may also refer to:

 "Love Is All We Need", a 1958 song by Tommy Edwards
 "Love Is All We Need", a 2003 song by Celine Dion from One Heart

See also
Love Is All You Need (disambiguation)
All You Need Is Love (disambiguation)